Miss Universe Malaysia 2016, the 50th edition of Miss Universe Malaysia, was held on January 30, 2016, at the Palace of the Golden Horses Hotel, Selangor. Kiran Jassal of Selangor was crowned by the outgoing titleholder, Vanessa Tevi Kumares of Negeri Sembilan at the end of the event. She then represented Malaysia at the Miss Universe 2016 pageant in Manila, Philippines.

Results

Gala Night Judges 

 Sonny San
Dato Dr Ko Chung Beng
Zaihani Mohd Zain
Shawn Loong
Dato Sri Navneet Goenka
Elaine Daly – Miss Universe Malaysia 2003
Jeff Lee
Datuk Wira Rahadian Mahmud Khalil
Awal Ashaari – actor, model and television presenter

Preliminary Judges 

 Dato' Farah Khan – founder and president of Malaysia's leading luxury retailer
 Gillian Hung – fashion guru
 Kavita Sidhu – Miss Charm International 1990, actress, fashion designer and producer
 Debbie Goh – malaysian actress
Whulandary Herman – Miss Universe Indonesia 2013
 Sukanya Poljak – actress
 Aster Lim
 Shawn Loong

Special Awards

Judges 
 Dato' Farah Khan - Founder and president of Malaysia's leading luxury retailer
 Gillian Hung - Fashion guru
 Kavita Sidhu - Miss Charm International 1990, Malaysian actress, fashion designer and a producer
 Debbie Goh - Malaysian actress
Whulandary Herman - Miss Universe Indonesia 2013
 Sukanya Poljak - Actress
 Aster Lim 
 Shawn Loong

Contestants

The official Top 14 finalists of The Next Miss Universe Malaysia 2016.

Crossovers 
Contestants who previously competed/appeared at other national beauty pageants:

Miss Malaysia World
 2014 - Dhivya Dhyana Suppiah (3rd Runner-up)

References

External links

2016 beauty pageants
2016 in Malaysia
2016
January 2016 events in Malaysia